Tomaspis inclusa is a species of true bug from the Cercopidae family. The scientific name of this species was first published in 1858 by Walker.

References

Cercopidae
Insects described in 1858